Hans Flock (born 18 April 1940) is a Norwegian judge.

He was born in Melhus, and graduated as cand.jur. from the University of Oslo in 1966. He worked as an independent lawyer in Trondheim from 1970, presiding judge in Frostating from 1981 and as a Supreme Court Justice from 1996 to 2010. He is known for scrutinizing the Liland Affair.

References

1940 births
Living people
People from Melhus
Supreme Court of Norway justices
20th-century Norwegian judges
University of Oslo alumni
21st-century Norwegian judges